Celia Bannerman (born 3 June 1944) is an English actress and director.

Career
Bannerman was born at Abingdon, Oxfordshire, and trained at the London Drama Centre. She started her professional career with Ralph Richardson as Dolly in Bernard Shaw's You Never Can Tell and Lucy in Sheridan's The Rivals followed by Cecily in "The Importance of Being Earnest" at the Theatre Royal, Haymarket, London. She played Lady Anne in "Richard III", Katherine in "Perkin Warbeck" and Mrs Galy Gay in "Man is Man" at the RSC. She played a number of major television roles early on in her acting career notably Elizabeth Bennet in Pride and Prejudice (1967), Cecily in The Importance of Being Earnest and Lady Diana Newbury in Upstairs, Downstairs. She starred in the films The Tamarind Seed (1974), Biddy (1983) for which she received an award from Moscow Film Festival, Little Dorrit (1987) and The Land Girls (1998).

Bannerman was Associate Director at the Bristol Old Vic directing The Price, Translations, Quartermaine's Terms, The White Devil, Good Fun and La Ronde. At Stratford East she directed, Sleeping Beauty and The Proposal. She was the Staff Director at the Royal National Theatre on The Passion, Larkrise, Fruits of Enlightenment and Strife. She also devised and directed a programme of erotic poetry called Making Love, and was the first woman to direct a play at the National Theatre, Lies in Plastic Smiles devised by the company and written by Gawn Grainger. In the West End she directed September Tide at the Comedy Theatre,  A Midsummer Night's Dream at the Open Air Theatre, Regent's Park, Jack and the Beanstalk at the Shaw Theatre and three world premieres  Beached, Sinners and Saints and  Bet Noir at the New Vic and Warehouse Theatre.

Bannerman has a long association with Sands Films starting by playing "Biddy" in Christine Edzards's film "Biddy" followed by setting up Edzard's first big feature film "Little Dorrit"  and casting the 200 actors. "Little Dorrit" was nominated for Oscars and won the LA Film Critics Award. Also for Sands Films she cast "The Fool", "As You Like It" and "A Dangerous Man: Lawrence after Arabia" which won an Emmy for Best Drama. 

She has been a Dialect Coach and a Children's Acting Coach on several movies including Seven Years in Tibet, Two Brothers, The Boy in the Striped Pyjamas and Nanny McPhee.

Family
She is married to Edward Klein. Parents Hugh Bannerman and Hilda Bannerman, née Diamond. Brother Julian Bannerman.

Filmography

References

External links 
 
 Celia Bannerman - Acting & Dialogue Coach
 Celia Bannerman Biography (1946-)
 
 Celia Bannerman(Aveleyman)
 Spotlight

English television actresses
English film actresses
English film directors
English television directors
1944 births
Living people
British women television directors